Ketevan Pkheidze (died 1744) was a Georgian princess of the family of Pkheidze (also known as Mkheidze) hailing from Imereti. She was the first legitimate wife of Heraclius II, then King of Kakheti and the future king of Kartli and Kakheti.

Biography  
Ketevan Pkheidze was born into a princely family in Imereti, a kingdom in western Georgia, tracing their origin to the 11th century. The branch to which Ketevan belonged had their estate centered at the village of Zedubani. Her father was Prince Zaal Pkheidze. She also had a sister who was married off into the ducal family of Racha; her name is not recorded.

Ketevan married Heraclius II in 1740, shortly after the prince repudiated his engagement (or actual marriage according to traditional accounts of Prince Vakhushti, Marie-Félicité Brosset, and Cyril Toumanoff) with Princess Ketevan Orbeliani, who thereafter retired to a monastery. In 1744, Heraclius was crowned king of Kakheti. Whoever was his consort, Heraclius had two children of his first marriage, Princess Rusudan (died in infancy) and Prince Vakhtang. Ketevan died of a severe illness in Telavi, being mourned by Heraclius and his father Teimuraz II, King of Kartli, who had arrived in Kakheti only to find his daughter-in-law dead. Her remains were taken and rested at the Alaverdi Cathedral. A year later, Heraclus married secondly to Princess Anna Abashidze.

Ancestry

References 

1744 deaths
Nobility of Georgia (country)
Queens consort of Kakheti
Year of birth unknown
18th-century people from Georgia (country)
18th-century women from Georgia (country)